Salih Butka (1852 – 24 October 1938), was an Albanian nationalist figure, kachak, poet, and one of the delegates of the city of Korçë to the Albanian National Congress of Lushnjë.

Butka was born in village Butkë of Kolonjë District to one of branches of large Frashëri family and he was a Bektashi Muslim. He belonged to a generation of village men that became literate and joined guerilla bands through the literary efforts of the Albanian intelligentsia. Butka became the commander of various Albanian irregular bands and initiated armed guerrilla operations in 1906 in regions of modern southern Albani which were part of the Ottoman Empire that time by being against the rule of Sultan Abdylhamid.  Having learned to read Albanian on his own, Butka during his guerrilla campaigns composed revolutionary poems that combined naturalistic texts with nationalist themes in a form of folk poetry and viewed his contributions as feeding an Albanian national consciousness. His poems would be turned into songs which appealed to villagers that were illiterate.

His guerrilla activities continued the next years and especially in the Balkan Wars (1912–1913) and World War I (1914–1918). During the Balkan Campaign of World War I, several warrior groups of Albanian Tosks and Ghegs supported with their activity the armed operations of the Central Powers in the region. Butka's band invaded in 1916 the town of Moscopole, once a prosperous metropolis in 18th century, and lead to its destruction.

The razing of the town forced many of its inhabitants to flee to nearby the occupied territories by Greece in Balkan Wars and some went in Korce also.

In 1920 he became one of the delegates of the city of Korçë to the Congress of Lushnjë.

Controversial personality
Butka's personality has created an ideological dilemma between homogeneity and heterogeneity myths in the pluralistic society of post-Communist Albania: while on specific Albanian textbooks he is considered a national hero, among circles of Aromanians he is considered a notorious criminal because he is held primarily responsible of the destruction of the Aromanian-inhabited settlement of Moscopole in 1916.

References

1852 births
1938 deaths
People from Kolonjë
World War I crimes by the Central Powers
Persecution of Eastern Orthodox Christians
Albanian nationalists
Sali
Albanian people of World War I
20th-century Albanian people